Rahimpur is a village in Khagaria District of the Indian state of Bihar. It is divided into three panchayats, Rahimpur Uttar (Rahimpur North), Rahimpur Madhya (Rahimpur Central) and Rahimpur Dakshin (Rahimpur South). It is situated on NH 31 on side and the riverbeds of Ganga.

Infrastructure 
Local infrastructure such as health centres, sanitation, and village roads, is inadequate. Annual floods disrupt services.

Transport 
The village is located by National Highway 31. The nearest railway station is Umeshnagar railway station in Durgapur village in Madhya Rahimpur.  The nearest major station is the Khagaria Railway station. The Munger rail and road bridge over the Ganga river are nearby.

Notables 
Notable people born in Rahimpur include:

 Umeshwar Prasad Singh, a local freedom fighter in the Indian Independence movement and the namesake of the Umeshnagar railway station
 Yogendra Sharma (Parliamentarian)
 Ramendra Kumar (Parliamentarian) 
 Abhayanand, the former DGP of Bihar and an educator, is connected to Rahimpur via his mother.

References 

Villages in Khagaria district